Alexandru Cuedan (26 September 1910 in Austria-Hungary (now Romania) – 9 May 1976) was a Romanian footballer who played as a defender.

Biography 

At club level, he played in Liga I for Rapid București, one of many clubs in the Romanian capital.

With the Romania national football team, he was picked by joint coaches Josef Uridil and Costel Rădulescu to take part in the 1934 World Cup in Italy. The team were eliminated in the first round by Czechoslovakia, 2–1.

Honours
Rapid București
Cupa României (3): 1936–37, 1937–38, 1938–39

External links

1910 births
1976 deaths
Sportspeople from Arad, Romania
People from the Kingdom of Hungary
Romanian Austro-Hungarians
Romania international footballers
Romanian footballers
1934 FIFA World Cup players
Liga I players
FC Rapid București players
Association football defenders